Frank Oz (born Frank Richard Oznowicz; May 25, 1944) is an American actor, puppeteer, and filmmaker. 

He began his career as a puppeteer, performing the Muppet characters of Miss Piggy, Fozzie Bear, Animal, and Sam Eagle on The Muppet Show, and Cookie Monster, Bert, and Grover on Sesame Street. He also puppeteered and/or provided the voice for Yoda in the Star Wars series.

His work as a director includes The Dark Crystal (1982), The Muppets Take Manhattan (1984), Little Shop of Horrors (1986), Dirty Rotten Scoundrels (1988), What About Bob? (1991), In & Out (1997), Death at a Funeral (2007), and an episode of the US television series Leverage (2011).

Early life
Oz was born on May 25, 1944, in Hereford, Herefordshire, England; the son of Frances (née Ghevaert; 1910–1989) and Isadore Oznowicz (1916–1998), both of whom were puppeteers. Some of their puppets survived the war and were presented  at the Contemporary Jewish Museum in San Francisco. His father was also a window trimmer. His parents moved to England where the father joined the Dutch Brigades. Oz's Dutch-Polish father was Jewish, and his Flemish mother was a Catholic. They left England when he was six months old and lived in Belgium until he was five.  Oz and his family moved to Montana in 1951.  They eventually settled in Oakland, California.  Oz attended Oakland Technical High School and Oakland City College. He worked as an apprentice puppeteer at Children's Fairyland as a teenager with the Vagabond Puppets, a production of the Oakland Recreation Department, where Lettie Connell was his mentor.

Career

Performing
Oz performed as a puppeteer with Jim Henson's Muppets. As a teenager, he worked with the Vagabond Puppets at the Children's Fairyland of Oakland, which is how he first met Henson. He was 19 when he joined Henson in New York to work on the Muppets in 1963. His characters have included Miss Piggy, Fozzie Bear, Animal, and Sam Eagle on The Muppet Show, and Grover, Cookie Monster and Bert on Sesame Street.

In addition to performing a variety of characters, Oz was one of the primary collaborators responsible for the development of the Muppets, known most notably for his chemistry with Jim Henson himself, performing in such pairings as: Ernie and Bert; Cookie Monster and Kermit the Frog; Kermit and Miss Piggy; Kermit and Fozzie Bear; Kermit and Grover; Rowlf the Dog and Fozzie; and The Swedish Chef (Henson performed the head and voice, with Oz normally operating the hands). Oz performed as a puppeteer in over 75 productions, including Labyrinth (as the Wiseman), video releases, and television specials, as well as countless other public appearances, episodes of Sesame Street, and other Jim Henson series. His puppetry work spans from 1963 to the present, although he semi-retired from performing his Muppets characters in 2001 (continuing to perform on Sesame Street on a yearly basis through 2012). In 2001, his characters were taken over primarily by Eric Jacobson (with David Rudman as Cookie Monster).

Oz explained why he decided on leaving the Muppets in a 2007 interview:

Oz is also known as the performer of Jedi Master Yoda from George Lucas' Star Wars series. Jim Henson had originally been contacted by Lucas about possibly performing Yoda. Henson was preoccupied and instead suggested Oz be assigned as the chief puppeteer of the character, as well as a creative consultant. Oz performed the puppet and provided the voice for Yoda in The Empire Strikes Back (1980), Return of the Jedi (1983), Star Wars: Episode I – The Phantom Menace (1999), and Star Wars: The Last Jedi (2017). Director Rian Johnson decided to return to using a puppet instead of using CGI in Star Wars: The Last Jedi (2017), even using the original mold, because he felt CGI would not have worked as it was not true to the Yoda Luke knew in The Empire Strikes Back (1980). Oz also provided the voice of the computer-generated imagery (CGI) Yoda in Star Wars: Episode II – Attack of the Clones (2002) and Star Wars: Episode III – Revenge of the Sith (2005). The conversion to CGI was met with some criticism among fans, but Oz himself said that was "exactly what [Lucas] should have done." Oz had a great deal of creative input on the character and was himself responsible for creating the character's trademark syntax. Oz returned to voice Yoda in several Disney theme park attractions, Star Tours–The Adventures Continue and within  Star Wars: Galaxy's Edge as well as in the Star Wars Rebels episodes, "Path of the Jedi" and "Shroud of Darkness".

Oz voiced Yoda in the 2020 Oculus Quest VR game "Tales from the Galaxy's Edge" alongside original C-3PO voice actor Anthony Daniels.

He directed the 2017 documentary Muppet Guys Talking: Secrets Behind the Show the Whole World Watched in which he and other Muppet performers discuss working behind the scenes with Jim Henson and the Muppets.

Directing
Inspiration as a filmmaker came to Oz upon a viewing of the Orson Welles film Touch of Evil (1958), the director told Robert K. Elder in an interview for The Film That Changed My Life:

Oz began his behind-the-camera work when he co-directed the fantasy film The Dark Crystal with long-time collaborator Jim Henson (Oz also puppeteered Aughra and the Skeksis Chamberlain in the film). The film featured the most advanced puppets ever created for a movie. Oz further employed those skills in directing 1984's The Muppets Take Manhattan, as well as sharing a screenwriting credit.

In 1986, he directed his first film that did not involve Henson, Little Shop Of Horrors. The musical film starred Rick Moranis and Ellen Greene, as well as Vincent Gardenia, Steve Martin, Bill Murray, John Candy, Christopher Guest, Jim Belushi and a 15-foot-tall talking plant (voiced by Levi Stubbs) which at times required up to 40 puppeteers to operate. The film allowed Oz to show his ability to work with live actors and led to opportunities to direct films that did not include puppetry.

Usually helming comedic productions, Oz went on to direct Dirty Rotten Scoundrels in 1988, starring Steve Martin and Michael Caine; What About Bob? in 1991, starring Bill Murray and Richard Dreyfuss; and Housesitter in 1992, starring Steve Martin and Goldie Hawn (all of which were scored by Miles Goodman). Later films include The Indian in the Cupboard (1995), In & Out (1997), Bowfinger (1999), The Score (2001), the 2004 remake of The Stepford Wives, and the original Death at a Funeral (2007).

Oz has frequently experienced on-set tension while directing his films, notably during the productions of What About Bob?, In & Out, The Score and The Stepford Wives.

In 2016, Oz directed a one-man stage show titled In & Of Itself starring Derek DelGaudio, which had its world premiere at the Geffen Playhouse on May 16. In April 2017, with the financial backing by Neil Patrick Harris among others, the play began its Off-Broadway theatrical run, which was initially slated for 10 weeks, but ended up extending its run for 72 weeks. In October 2020, the streaming service Hulu purchased the rights to a live recording of the play, which debuted on January 22, 2021.

Unrealized projects
In the late 1980s, Oz was attached to direct a film adaptation of F. Scott Fitzgerald’s 1922 short story "The Curious Case of Benjamin Button" for Universal Pictures, with Martin Short slated to star.  Oz dropped out of the project after he could not figure out how to make the story work.

Oz was also going to direct the 1990 film Mermaids after Lasse Hallström dropped out of the project.  However, Oz also left the project due to creative differences and was ultimately replaced by Richard Benjamin.  Oz reportedly did not get along with Cher, who starred in the film.

It was reported in 1992 that Oz was slated to direct a film adaptation of the musical Dreamgirls for The Geffen Film Company.  Oz also planned to direct an unmade film titled Swing Vote before directing Dreamgirls.

In the late 1990s, it was reported that Oz was going to direct either Sylvester Stallone or Bruce Willis in an unmade film titled Ump for Metro-Goldwyn-Mayer.

Oz claimed in a 2007 interview with The A.V. Club that he turned down the offer to direct Harry Potter and the Chamber of Secrets (2002).  However, Oz later retracted his statement about turning down the project in a 2021 interview: “No, they didn’t offer it to me. They asked me if I was interested. So it wasn’t really an offer.”

In 2006, Dick Cook hired Oz to write and direct The Cheapest Muppet Movie Ever Made for Walt Disney Pictures.  However, Disney passed on the project in favor of Jason Segel's script following Cook's departure from the studio.

Acting
As an actor, Oz appeared in one scene as a Prison Storeroom Keeper in The Blues Brothers (1980), directed by John Landis. He appeared in a similar role and scene in Trading Places (1983), also directed by Landis. He had roles in several other Landis films including An American Werewolf in London (1981), Spies Like Us (1985), Innocent Blood (1992), and Blues Brothers 2000 (1998). In 2001, he had a voice acting role in the Pixar film Monsters, Inc. as Randall's scare assistant, Fungus. In 2005, he had a minor part in the Columbia film Zathura as the voice of the robot. He played a lawyer in the critically acclaimed 2019 film Knives Out.

Oz played a surgeon in scenes cut from the theatrical release of Superman III. Other cameos have included The Muppet Movie, The Great Muppet Caper, The Muppets Take Manhattan and several other Jim Henson-related films that did not involve just his puppeteering.

When Oz does not appear in a Landis film, his name is often spoken in the background. During airport scenes in Into the Night and Coming to America, there are announcements on the PA system for "Mr. Frank Oznowicz".

Personal life
Oz was married to Robin Garsen from 1979 to 2005. He married his second wife Victoria Labalme in 2011. Oz is the father of four sons. He maintained a residence in England for nine years and, as of 2012, lives in Manhattan.

Filmography

Film

Filmmaking credits

Television

As director

Video games

Awards and nominations

References

External links

 
 
 
 

1944 births
Living people
20th-century American male actors
21st-century American male actors
American male film actors
American male television actors
American male voice actors
American people of Dutch-Jewish descent
American people of Flemish descent
American people of Polish-Jewish descent
American puppeteers
Comedy film directors
Daytime Emmy Award winners
Emmy Award winners
Film directors from California
Male actors from Montana
Male actors from Oakland, California
Muppet performers
People from Hereford
Primetime Emmy Award winners
Sesame Street crew
Sesame Street Muppeteers